A boulevard is a type of broad avenue planted with rows of trees, or in parts of North America, any urban highway.

Boulevards were originally circumferential roads following the line of former city walls.

In American usage, boulevards may be wide, multi-lane arterial thoroughfares, often divided with a central median, and perhaps with side-streets along each side designed as slow travel and parking lanes and for bicycle and pedestrian usage, often with above-average quality of landscaping and scenery.

Etymology

The word boulevard is borrowed from French. In French, it originally meant the flat surface of a rampart, and later a promenade taking the place of a demolished fortification. It is a borrowing from the Dutch word  'bulwark'.

Usage world-wide

Asia

Cambodia
Phnom Penh has numerous boulevards scattered throughout the city. Norodom Boulevard, Monivong Boulevard, Sihanouk Boulevard, and Kampuchea Krom Boulevard are the most famous.

India
Bengaluru's Mahatma Gandhi Raste (South Parade Road and Queens Road) is an important boulevard that connects Bengaluru's downtown at Minsk Square (Queens Road Circle/M G Road Circle) to Trinity Circle in East Bengaluru where it meets Swami Vivekananda Raste (Old Madras Road), Old Airport Road (Trinity Church Road) and Kensington Road. It is named after freedom fighter Mahatma Gandhi. The second one is Rashtreeya Vidyalaya Road connecting South End Circle in Jayanagara to Marenahalli Road in Jayaprakash Narayan Nagara. This boulevard is lined with parks on both sides. The third one is Chord Road lined with parks on both sides passes through the localities of Mahalakshmi Layout, Rajajinagara, Basaveshwaranagara and Vijayanagara. It connects Tumakuru Road to Mysuru Road. Fourth one is a section of Dr. Puneeth Rajkumar Vartula Raste (Outer Ring Road) in Horamavu. This road is named after Dr. Puneeth Rajkumar. A fifth one that is under construction is the upcoming Nadaprabhu Kempegowda Layout connecting Magadi Road to Mysuru Road. This is expected to be one of the widest boulevards in Bengaluru. Apart from these major roads there are many minor avenues and boulevard in Bengaluru. This makes Bengaluru one of the few cities in India with so many boulevards mainly due to its title as the "Garden City".
Chennai's Anna Salai (Mount Road) is a major road that connects Chennai's downtown Fort St. George near Cooum Creek to the then suburbs of Parangimalai (St. Thomas Mount). It ends at Kathipara Junction in Guindy. It is named after former chief minister of Tamil Nadu C. N. Annadurai.  Another important boulevard is Dr. Radhakrishnan Salai (Cathedral Road). which connects Kamarajar Promenade (South Beach Road) along the Marina Beach in Mylapore to Anna Flyover (Gemini Circle) where it meets Anna Salai, Mahatma Gandhi Salai (Nungambakkam High Road) and Gopathi Narayanaswamy Chetty Road. It is named after former President Dr. Sarvepalli Radhakrishnan.
Kolkata's Indira Gandhi Sarani (Red Road), is a road that runs from Raj Bhavan to Fort William. The road, a wide boulevard, was built in 1820 and bisects the historic Maidan. The British authorities during the colonial era intended for the road to be able to host large parades. The name 'Red Road' was given due to its surfacing. During the Second World War, the road, in the heart of Kolkata, served as a landing strip for fighter aircraft. The annual Kolkata Marathon starts from outside the Rangers Club on the road. The name Indira Gandhi Sarani was officially adopted in 1985 after former Prime Minister Indira Gandhi.
Mumbai's Netaji Subhash Chandra Bose Marg (Marine Drive) is a  -long crescent-shaped coastal road located in South Mumbai along the Arabian Sea. It is also called the Queen's Necklace because if the stretch is viewed from an elevated point, the lamp posts along the road seem like pearls and thus in continuation look like a necklace. A promenade lies parallel to the road. It is one of the major tourist attractions in Mumbai. Local residents use it for morning exercises as well. It is also popular among youths who come here to enjoy the splash of water during high tide. It is named after the freedom fighter and founder of the Indian National Army Netaji Subhash Chandra Bose.
Mysuru's Krishnaraja Boulevard is Asia's first boulevard. It was built in 1799, by the Krishnaraja Wadiyar III, taking inspiration from his France tour. The road runs almost a kilometre from Balla Circle to Hunsuru Road. Many landmarks are located on it.
New Delhi's Kartavya Path (Rajpath/Kingsways), which is also a thoroughfare. New Delhi being the national capital, many such thoroughfares were built widely to sustain the exploding traffic growth that New Delhi and most Indian metro cities have seen in recent decades. Kartavya path, a tree-lined road with ponds and fountains, was designed, along with Janpath (Queensway), by British architect Edwin Lutyens during the British Raj. Various national events such as Independence Day parades and Republic Day parades among many others take place over here annually.
Hyderabad's P. V. Narasimha Rao Marg (Necklace Road) is a boulevard adjoining Hussain Sagar lake. It is named after former Prime Minister P. V. Narasimha Rao.
Vijayawada's Mahatma Gandhi Road (Bandar Road) is a 4 km long major road and boulevard which connects Benz Circle, the busiest traffic circle in the city to Avatar Park. It runs almost parallel to the Bandar Canal.
Srinagar's Foreshore Road is also famous.

Indonesia

Some of the most important thoroughfares in Jakarta are not named as a boulevard while do in fact follow the boulevard configuration of multiple lanes and/or landscaping. Examples of these are Jalan Jenderal Sudirman, Jalan M.H. Thamrin, Jalan Jenderal Gatot Subroto, Jalan H.R. Rasuna Said, Jalan Gajah Mada/Jalan Hayam Wuruk, Jalan Haji Benyamin Sueb, Jalan Teuku Umar (formerly Van Heutszboulevard), and Jalan Prof. Dr. Satrio. The term boulevard - sometimes under its Indonesian translation "bulevar" - is however commonly used for thoroughfares in integrated urban centers as developed by private developers, such as Jalan Boulevard Raya in Kelapa Gading, Jalan Boulevard BSD Timur in Bumi Serpong Damai and Jalan Boulevard Gading Serpong in Gading Serpong. Note that the term "Jalan" (Indonesian word for Street or Road) is still officially used despite the use of the term "Boulevard".
Examples of boulevards in other Indonesian cities are Jalan Dago (Jalan Ir. H. Juanda) in Bandung, Jalan Pahlawan in Semarang, and Jalan Mayjen Sungkono and Jalan Raya Darmo in Surabaya.

Iran

In Iran, "Boulevard" is generally defined as a wide road surrounded by trees in sides and divided by a green space line including grass, trees or buxuses in the middle. There are many boulevards in Iran. One of the most famous Boulevard in Tehran, Keshavarz Boulevard,conclusively defines how Boulevards are designed in iran.
From the Safavid era onward, with the growth of the city out of the old part of town road was also sorted out as an urban designing elements. During this period, wide and long streets such as Chaharbagh Street in Isfahan were built. Charbagh (which seems to be a concept originated in Persian gardens) is one of the symbolic elements in the history of Safavid urban planning, which has been one of the main elements of the development and improvement of cities in this era.

According to an Iranian historian “In the Safavid period (about 400 years ago), in lieu of the beyaban (desert path), the concept of the kheyaban (street/Boulevard) has been formed, which either leads to the main square of the city or runs parallel to it. these streets has countless trees on its sides, and are called Chaharbagh or Chenarestan (a place where planes trees are) based on their geographical location”[ Habibi, 1995:93 ].

This axe (Charbagh) has become the main backbone of the city and by having dominant buildings at the ends, guaranteed the development of the city linearly in this direction.
Due to the temporal precedence of Iranian Charbags, over the boulevards of Paris, and the existence of accurate drawings of it by European tourists, some experts assume Iranian Charbags as the precursor of the contemporary boulevards formation.

Israel 
Tel Aviv, was originally designed along the guidelines set out by architect Sir Patrick Geddes. Geddes designed a green or garden ring of boulevards surrounding the central city, which still exists today and continues to characterize Tel Aviv. One of the most famous and busy streets in the city is Rothschild Boulevard.

Philippines 

Roxas Boulevard is a major boulevard in Metro Manila, Philippines. The boulevard, which runs along the shores of Manila Bay, is popular for its view of Manila's famous sunsets and stretch of coconut trees. The boulevard is an eight-lane major arterial road designated as Radial Road 1 that connects the center of Manila with Pasay and Parañaque.

Other boulevards in Metro Manila include the Shaw Boulevard, España Boulevard, Pedro Tuazon Boulevard and Quezon Boulevard. Not all boulevards in the Philippines have ornamentation, or slow lanes, like the Aurora Boulevard and E. Rodriguez Sr. Boulevard, which have no ornamentation at all.

Osmeña Boulevard is a boulevard in Cebu City, the Philippines' second city. It is Cebu's most important street and is its primary ceremonial avenue, the conventional route of the city's civic and cultural parades. Measuring six to ten lanes wide with 3-5 meter-wide sidewalks on both sides and a landscaped central median, the boulevard is lined with narra trees. Midway is the park and roundabout of Fuente Osmeña.

Europe

Austria 

The Ring Road (German: Ringstraße) is a circular ring road surrounding the Innere Stadt district of Vienna, Austria and is one of its main sights. Constructed in the mid-19th century after the dismantling of the city fortification walls, its architecture is typical of the eclectic, historicist style called Ringstraßenstil (Ring Road Style) of the 1860s to s.

Known for its unique architectural beauty and history, it has also been called the "Lord of the ring roads", and is inscribed by UNESCO as part of Vienna's World Heritage Site.

The Ringstraße is 5.2 kilometers (3.2 miles) long and has several sections. It surrounds the central area of Vienna on all sides, except for the northeast, where its place is taken by the Franz-Josephs-Kai, the street going along the Donaukanal (a branch of the Danube). Starting from the Ringturm at the northern end of the Franz-Josephs-Kai, the sections are:

 Schottenring (named after the Schottenstift)
 Universitätsring (university)
 Dr.-Karl-Renner-Ring (named after Karl Renner), formerly called "Parlamentsring"
 Burgring (near the Hofburg)
 Opernring (near the Vienna State Opera)
 Kärntner Ring (named after Kärntner Straße, the road that led south to Carinthia)
 Schubertring (named after Franz Schubert)
 Parkring (near the Stadtpark)
 Stubenring (named after the Stubenbastei fortification, part of Vienna's city walls since 1156)

Azerbaijan 

Neftchiler Avenue (Azerbaijani: Neftçilər Prospekti) is an arterial road in Baku, Azerbaijan. It begins at the west end of the Bayil district of Baku and continues east until terminating at Javanshir Bridge (formerly Gagarin Bridge) intersecting Uzeyir Hajibeyov Street. It is used as part of the Baku City Circuit, including the Start-Finish straight located next to Government House

Previous names of Neftchilar Avenue were Alexander II Quay, Gubanov Quay, and Stalin Avenue. The street was named Neftchilar Avenue in 1961 in honour of workers of oil industry in Azerbaijan. The larger section of the avenue runs along Baku Boulevard.

Denmark 
In Copenhagen, a Boulevard Ring, consisting of a North Boulevard (Danish: Nørre Boulevard) and a West Boulevard (Danish: Vestre Boulevard),  emerged on the site of the city's former Bastioned Fortification Ring in the second half of the 19th century. It lends its name to the underground Boulevard Line. The North Boulevard is now known as Nørre Voldgade and the West Boulevard was renamed H. C. Andersens Boulevard in honour of the writer Hans Christian Andersen in 1955. The first part of Vesterbrogade, then known as Vesterbro Passage, was also laid out as a boulevard. A South Boulevard (Danish: Sønder Boulevard) was established in the grounds of a defunct railway in the Vesterbro district in 1905. Other streets that incorporate 'Boulevard' in their names include Dalgas Boulevard in Frederiksberg and Strandboulevarden (The Beach Boulevard) in Østerbro. Another street that meets the criteria for being described as a boulevard is Frederiksberg Allé. A more recent example of a boulevard in Copenhagen is Ørestad Boulevard, the principal artery of the new Ørestad district.

France 

The Grands Boulevards of Paris were first built in the 17th and 18th centuries. They are: the boulevards Beaumarchais, des Filles-du-Calvaire, du Temple, Saint-Martin, Saint-Denis, de Bonne-Nouvelle, Poissonnière, Montmartre, des Italiens, des Capucines and the de la Madeleine.

Baron Haussmann created many boulevards in his renovation of Paris during the Second Empire. from 1859 to 1869.

Germany 

Berlin
The historically most famous boulevard in Berlin and arguably in all of Germany is Unter den Linden: location of the Berlin State Opera, Berlin Cathedral, the former royal palace, Humboldt University, the Neue Wache state memorial, the Germany Historical Museum housed in the old arsenal and Brandenburg Gate being the boulevard's focal point. Most famed for its classy shopping facilities is Berlin's Kurfürstendamm.

In the 1920s it was considered one of the most cosmopolitan places in Europe, being not only an elegant residential area but also a major centre of nightlife and leisure. Ku'damm retained this air throughout the Cold War becoming the hub of free West-Berlin. It is still the city's most frequented shopping district.

A notable boulevard in Berlin's East is Karl-Marx-Allee, which was built primarily in the 1950s in Stalinist Classicism architecture with decorative buildings. One section of the boulevard is more decorative while the other is more modern. In the center of the boulevard is the Strausberger Platz, which has buildings in wedding-cake style. The boulevard is divided into various blocks. Between 1949 and 1989, it was the main center of East Berlin. The Königsallee in Düsseldorf is known for its many famous fashion stores and showrooms.

The  (Boulevard der Stars) was unveiled in 2010, with the first of 40 stars  devoted to actors and filmmakers of the German-speaking film and TV industry. First to be honoured in the Boulevard was German-American actress Marlene Dietrich.

Other cities
Munich is well known for its four royal avenues constructed by the Bavarian monarchs of the 19th century, which can also be classified as boulevards: Brienner Straße, Leopoldstraße, Maximilianstraße, and Prinzregentenstraße.

Hungary

The Hungarian capital Budapest is also known for its well planned street system with wide avenues and boulevards, running through the city. There are three main boulevards, named Little Boulevard, Grand Boulevard and Hungária Boulevard. Little Boulevard was built on the demolished medieval city walls of Pest in the late 19th century. Grand Boulevard, the most prominent, was built for the 1000th anniversary of the Hungarian conquest in 1896. It has a uniform facade, and the busiest tram line in Europe.

Hungária Boulevard was built from 1980 to 2000 and it is the widest (70 meters, like Champs-Élysées) and longest (13 kilometers) boulevard in Budapest with six to ten traffic lanes and a rapid tram line. Although the construction of the boulevard was finished in 2000, the facade is still incomplete, as there are many empty parcels due to demolition of old apartments and factories.

Ireland
Ireland has relatively few boulevards, but O'Connell Street in Dublin is one of Europe's widest streets and resembles a Victorian boulevard. In recent housing developments in Dublin, the boulevard is becoming more and more common in addresses (e.g. Tyrellstown Blvd, Park Blvd, Bayside Blvd), and a boulevard was opened in Gorey, County Wexford in early 2015.

Italy

Florence's historic centre, for example, is surrounded by the Viali di Circonvallazione, a series of six-lane streets; the boulevards follow the outline of the ancient walls of Florence, that were demolished since 1865 to make Florence, then the capital of Italy (for five years, 1865–1870), a modern and big city like the other European capitals. The Viali were inspired by the similar Parisian boulevards.

The first boulevard in Italy was constructed in Parma in 1759. 
Ennemond Alexandre Petitot (1727-1801) was a French-born architect, mainly active in the Duchy of Parma. He was recruited by the Prime Minister Guillaume du Tillot to become the architect of the recently installed Bourbon Dukes in Parma. He was the architect of the first Italian boulevard-promenade (1759-1763), based on the French promenades publiques, along what is now Stradone Martiri della Liberta (at the time, the name had changed from the Stradone Farnese to Stradone Borbone). 

Antonio Gaidon (1738 – 1829), an architect, civil engineer and town planner from Bassano del Grappa built a boulevard in the town (1791 – 1794), now known as the Viale delle Fosse. The large central avenue, flanked in turn by two pedestrian avenues, was adorned with a double row of lime trees and numerous statues that, starting from the Porta delle Grazie, reached the Parolini Garden. This new road was called the "Passeggio pubblico di Belvedere o Fosse". (In English: "Belvedere or Fosse public walk".)

Spain

Barcelona has several impressive boulevards, notably Gran Via de les Corts Catalans / Avinguda de la Granvia and Avinguda Diagonal. The infamous pedestrian tourist promenade, Las Ramblas, might be described as such, although the vehicular lanes to the sides are relatively insignificant.

Portugal
In Lisbon, Avenida da Liberdade with extensive side gardens and Avenida da República. In Porto and Setúbal, Avenida dos Aliados and Avenida Luísa Todi have oval gardens in the center of the street, separating the two directions.

Poland

Boulevards are representative places in cities situated near big rivers and usually parts of their centres, for example in Kraków, Warsaw, Toruń, Bydgoszcz, Gdańsk, Gorzów Wielkopolski, Wrocław and Świnoujście.

One of the most famous boulevards in Poland is the street named Wały Chrobrego (former German name: Hakenterrasse) in Szczecin, where the final events of The Tall Ships' Races took place in 2007 and 2013. This is a street complex, about 100 years old, at the river bank of Oder with some connections to the harbour in Szczecin and the Baltic Sea. There are many tourist attractions e.g. National Museum in Szczecin, the Contemporary Theater (Teatr Współczesny), Statue of Hercules fighting the Centaur and the waterfront for ships, including harbour cruise ships and hydrofoil to Świnoujście. In the area there are more historic buildings situated, for instance The Ducal Castle.

Some tourist towns and villages are known among others for their boulevards and esplanades. There are many localities situated by the sea, for example Sopot, Gdynia, Kołobrzeg, Misdroy and Świnoujście, or other types of big water areas as Trzebież lying on the Szczecin Lagoon. Feliks Nowowiejski Seaside Boulevard in Gdynia was the first stage of the Tour de Pologne in 2003. Boulevards are also representative places in Gryfino (district town in Poland) and German village Mescherin localized by both sides of the valley of Oder river protected with Lower Odra Valley Landscape Park.

There are also many boulevards by lakes and small rivers, mainly in harbours areas, as in Giżycko, and in urban parks, for example in Łobez, Piotrków Trybunalski, Poznań and the oldest Polish urban park in Kalisz founded in 1798. Boulevards and paths in Łazienki Park in Warsaw surround Palace on the Water. The medieval port crane, called Żuraw, over Motława river, the junction of two boulevards - Długie Pobrzeże and Rybackie Pobrzeże - is the symbol of the medieval harbour of Gdańsk. The Old Town Promenade (Promenada Staromiejska) in Wrocław was built on the former on the former defensive fortifications along the City Moat and a small section along the Oder river. The boulevard in Kasprowicz Park in Szczecin leads along Rusałka Lake from the City Hall area to The Summer Theater (Teatr Letni) and then to Różanka Rose Garden and the forest of Puszcza Wkrzańska. The scenic above ground promenade in Augustów enables the observation of the Augustów Canal and national roads 8 and 16.

Russia

The dictionary defines boulevard as a wide green strip in the middle of a city street or on the embankment. The historic Boulevard Ring in Moscow emerged on the site of the former White City walls (demolished in the 1760s and 1770s) before the Fire of 1812, starting with Tverskoy Boulevard in 1796. The whole ring was replanted and rebuilt after the fire, in the 1820s; together with the embankments of Moskva River the boulevards form the second centremost city ring.

Green boulevards of that period were terminated with corner hotel and shop buildings, most of them eventually demolished to make way for street traffic. Garden Ring, developed in the middle of the 19th century, had traditional median boulevards in its western part and side gardens in the east (streets with side strips of green, even those separating main traffic and frontage roads, are not usually considered boulevards).

Street names of Saint Petersburg evolved differently: median greens of major avenues were called boulevards, but the avenues themselves typically were and still are called prospekts (i.e. Bolshoy Prospekt of Vasilievsky Island).

United Kingdom
Owing to the lack of modern-era walled cities and the price of urban land, the UK has only a few boulevards. Glasgow's Mosspark Boulevard, a wide road along Bellahouston Park with former segregated lanes for trams and cars, and Great Western Road, colloquially known as 'The Boulevard', north of the river Clyde, is a good example, a mostly dual carriageway road running to the outer suburbs passing through the fashionable West End district, with many shops and bars dotted along the route. The Almondvale Boulevard is a major road in Livingston, West Lothian.

After the Great Fire of London, London was planned to be rebuilt with straight boulevards, squares and plazas, as seen in mainland Europe, but due to land ownership issues these plans never came to fruition. Boulevards in London are rare. Milton Keynes, Buckinghamshire, is one of only a handful of examples where boulevards are a key feature. This is due to Milton Keynes being built as a modern new town in the 1960s.

Nottingham, and to a lesser extent Leicester, also have extensive networks of boulevards, although some lower-capacity streets are named boulevards; these include Asquith Way/Boulevard in West Knighton and Hungarton Boulevard in Humberstone, both of which form part of Leicester's outer ring road. Gilbert Boulevard in Arnold is an example of a low-capacity highway named a boulevard.

The town of Warrington in Cheshire has a large number of boulevards, some more recent than others. Lining the Gemini Retail Park in Warrington is Europa Boulevard with the traditional tree-lined pavements and two-lane traffic. In Chapelford, a recent housing development built on the old Burtonwood Airbase site, are a number of boulevards such as Boston and Santa Rosa Boulevard, named in reference to the American history associated with World War II on the site.

Another rare example of a road named as a "boulevard" is Bourges Boulevard in Peterborough.

Birmingham, known as the UK's Second City, has many dual-carriageway boulevards. Roads such as the A4040 (Outer Ring Road) and various other sections of dual-carriageway often have great amounts of trees, grass and scenery on both sides, as well as part of the wide central reservation.

Other towns and cities have sections of roadway which could be described as boulevards where central tramways have been abandoned.

Turkey

Barbaros Boulevard is opened in 1958 due to new city planning in Istanbul. Ankara also has a lot of boulevards.

North America

Canada
Lake Shore Boulevard, a six-lane thoroughfare, runs along the lakefront in Toronto from Woodbine Avenue in the east to the city limits in the west. The section between Jameson Avenue and the Humber River (the original section), as an example of urban planning, was laid out to provide a pleasant drive with a view of Humber Bay on Lake Ontario and easy access to the park lands by automobile. It was later expanded for commuting.

Dominican Republic
In the Dominican Republic, more specifically in Greater Santo Domingo  there is the Winston Churchill and 27 de Febrero Boulevard in Downtown Santo Domingo and Las Americas Boulevard in Santo Domingo Este.

Jamaica
The most notable boulevards in Jamaica are the Washington Boulevard in Kingston and the Jimmy Cliff Boulevard in Montego Bay.

Mexico
Paseo de la Reforma (English: "Reform Promenade") is a 12-kilometer-long boulevard in Mexico City, Mexico that runs in a straight line, cutting diagonally across the city. It runs from Chapultepec Park, then passes alongside the Torre Mayor (currently Latin America's tallest building), continues through the fashionable Zona Rosa and then to the Zócalo by Juárez Avenue and Francisco I. Madero Street. One of the most famous monuments of the Paseo is El Ángel de la Independencia – a tall column with a gilded statue of a Winged Victory on its top and marble statues at its base depicting the heroes of the Mexican War of Independence.

The Paseo de la Reforma was designed in the 1860s during the Second Mexican Empire by the Austrian military officer and engineer Ferdinand von Rosenzweig on the orders of Maximilian I of Mexico. He wanted to connect his imperial residence, Chapultepec Castle, to the Palacio Nacional in the city's center. When it was inaugurated, it was named the Paseo de la Emperatriz (The Empress's Promenade), after his consort, Empress Carlota of Mexico. The name now commemorates the liberal reforms of 19th-century president Benito Juárez.

United States

In many places in the United States, municipalities and developers have adapted the term to refer to arterial roads, not necessarily boulevards in the traditional sense. In California, many so-called "boulevards" extend into the mountains as narrow, winding road segments only two lanes in width. However, boulevards can be any divided highway with at-grade intersections to local streets. They are commonly abbreviated Blvd. 

Nineteenth-century parkways, such as Brooklyn's Ocean Parkway, were often built in the form of boulevards but do not use the word in their name. Likewise, the northern section of Broadway in Manhattan is designed as a boulevard.

Some notable examples include:
San Francisco's Sunset Boulevard, which has rows of trees on both sides of the thoroughfare, and is bisected by a tree-filled median. It connects local streets throughout the Sunset District.
Los Angeles's Sunset Boulevard; Santa Monica Boulevard; Wilshire Boulevard; and Hollywood Boulevard. Many important thoroughfares in Los Angeles bear the name Boulevard.
Chicago's boulevard system is a network of wide, planted-median boulevards that winds through the south, west, and north sides of the city and includes a ring of parks. Most of the boulevards and parks are 3–6 miles from The Loop. 
Seattle features a network of boulevards that connect most of the city's public parks to each other, a design recommended by the Olmsted Brothers.
Philadelphia's boulevard system includes the length of the Benjamin Franklin Parkway known as the Museum District. It also includes the arterial roadway of the Roosevelt Boulevard and the Southern Boulevard Parkway built as a connecting median of two urban parks, but now also serves as the west roadway entrance of the world class centralized Philadelphia Sports Complex and gatehouse entrance of the Philadelphia Navy Yard in South Philadelphia.
Atlanta's minimally named Boulevard

Oceania

Australia
Melbourne has at least four roads named "the Boulevard". These are, generally, long roads with many curves which wind alongside the Yarra River (Yarra Scenic Drive) or Maribyrnong River. In addition, the spelling of boulevard with an extra 'e' is common, for example the Southlands Boulevarde shopping centre in southern Perth. Australia post officially abbreviates boulevard as "BVD".

Several Melbourne thoroughfares not named as a boulevard do in fact follow the boulevard configuration of multiple lanes and landscaping. These include St Kilda Road, Royal Parade, Victoria Parade, Flemington Road, and the outer section of Mount Alexander Road.

Boulevards in Sydney include:
Norwest Boulevard in the Hills Shire, which runs through Norwest and Bella Vista,
The Boulevard in the City of Canterbury, which runs through Punchbowl, Wiley Park and Lakemba
The Boulevard in the City of Fairfield, which runs through Canley Vale, Fairfield, Fairfield West, Fairfield Heights and Smithfield.
The Boulevarde in Inner West Council, which runs through Dulwich Hill, Lewisham and Petersham.
The Boulevarde in the Sutherland Shire, which runs through Sutherland, Kirrawee, Gymea, Miranda and Caringbah.
Additionally, single-suburb boulevards are situated in Brighton-le-Sands, Cammeray, Cheltenham, Epping, Lidcombe, Lilyfield, Malabar, Newport, Sans Souci, Strathfield and Yagoona.

New Zealand

Construction began on the Orewa Boulevard in March 2009, the works are expected to be complete by February 2010. This boulevard will be approximately 400 m long with Pohutukawa and palm lined footpaths, a wide cycleway will be constructed on the beach side of the road and carparks on the business side.  The Orewa Boulevard is a project commissioned by the Rodney District Council with the vision of connecting the CBD to Orewa Beach.

Central Christchurch is surrounded and connected by a series of large boulevards (usually called "avenues" in New Zealand). These include four which surround the central city, Bealey Avenue, Fitzgerald Avenue, Deans Avenue, and Moorhouse Avenue, and also Riccarton Avenue, which traverses the large central city park, Hagley Park. The centre of the city is often described locally as being "within the Four Avenues".

South America

Argentina
Avenida 9 de Julio in the heart of Buenos Aires, which is the capital city of Argentina, is as wide as seven lanes in each direction, with four further lanes flanking the main boulevard in parallel roads on either side.

Colombia

In Bogotá, La Soledad Park Way Boulevard is a 1 kilometer important boulevard, in the Locality of Teusaquillo located in Bogotá's City Center and it crosses from the street 35 to street 45.

In the boulevard you can see several monuments and restaurants including Crepes & Waffles, Kokoriko, Subway, The Cheesecake Factory, and the historical hotel Hotel Park Way Boulevard

Uruguay
In Montevideo, Artigas Boulevard is an important avenue ( wide) that encloses the central area.

References

Books

External links 
 
 Boulevards in Vietnam

 
Types of roads
Types of streets